The badminton men's doubles tournament at the 1998 Asian Games in Bangkok took place from 13 December to 17 December at Thammasat Gymnasium 2.

Schedule
All times are Indochina Time (UTC+07:00)

Results

Final

Top half

Bottom half

References

Men's doubles